Corey Yuen (born Ying Gang-ming (殷元奎); 16 December 1951) is a Hong Kong film director, film producer, action choreographer, and former actor.

Yuen was a member of the Peking Opera Schools and one of the Seven Little Fortunes. As an actor, Yuen is perhaps best known as Rubber Legs' student in 1979 kung fu comedy film Dance of the Drunk Mantis. As an action director, Yuen gained fame in American cinema beginning with 1998 film Lethal Weapon 4, followed by the 2000 blockbuster X-Men and six of Jet Li's American works: Romeo Must Die, Kiss of the Dragon, The One, Cradle 2 the Grave, War, and The Expendables.

History and early career

Born Ying Gang-ming on 15 February 1951 in Hong Kong, he was one of Jackie Chan, Sammo Hung and Yuen Biao's best friends during their days in the China Drama Academy Peking Opera School and took a stage name of Yuen Kwai. They spent those days training in a harshly disciplined style under the watch of Master Yu Jim-yuen. He would go to appear as an extra in Hong Kong action films during the "chop socky" era of the 1970s.

Acting
In the 1970s, Yuen had three Hwang Jang Lee films: Secret Rivals 2 (1977) as Silver Fox's henchman; The Invincible Armour (1977) as Assassin; and film Dance of the Drunk Mantis (1979) as Rubber Legs' student.

In the 1980s, Yuen played Devil Disciple Leader in the 1983 film Zu Warriors from the Magic Mountain, alongside Sammo Hung, Yuen Biao and Mang Hoi. Yuen played SWAT Team Member in 1985 film Heart of the Dragon, alongside Sammo Hung and Jackie Chan. Yuen played Bad Egg in 1986 film Righting Wrongs (who also directed), along with Yuen Biao, Melvin Wong, Cynthia Rothrock, Peter Cunningham and Siu-wong Fan. Yuen played Judy Wu in 1987 film Eastern Condors along with Sammo Hung, Joyce Godenzi, Billy Chow, Yuen Biao, Siu-chung Mok, Yuen Woo-ping and Melvin Wong.

In the 1990s, Yuen played Man in the Boat in the 1990 film She Shoots Straight, (who also directed) along with Joyce Godenzi, Sammo Hung and Yuen Wah. Yuen played Li Kwon Bon in 1993 film Fong Sai-yuk II (who also directed) alongside Jet Li. Yuen played Uncle Po in 1997 film Hero (not to be confused with the Zhang Yimou directed, Jet Li starring 2002 film of the same name) (who also directed) alongside Yuen Biao and Takeshi Kaneshiro.

In the 2010s, Yuen played Cao Cao's General in the 2010 film Just Another Pandora's Box alongside Ronald Cheng, Yuen Biao, Kai-man Tin, Siu-wong Fan and Wu Jing.

Filmmaking and choreography films
Yuen is now one of the top action directors to hit both Hong Kong and the United States. In July 1981, Yuen made his Hong Kong directorial debut in 1982 film Ninja in the Dragon's Den, along with Hiroyuki Sanada, Conan Lee and Hwang Jang Lee. In June 1985, Yuen made his American directorial debut in 1986 film No Retreat, No Surrender, which marked the film debut of Belgium martial artist actor Jean-Claude Van Damme. He has worked with most of Hong Kong's top stars at one time or another, and began Michelle Yeoh and Cynthia Rothrock's career in 1985 with Yes, Madam. He directed in 1990 film All for the Winner alongside Stephen Chow, followed by its 1991 sequel Top Bet alongside Anita Mui. He has also directed Jackie Chan with Sammo Hung in 1988 film Dragons Forever, and directed Anita Mui, Andy Lau and Aaron Kwok in Saviour of the Soul.

In 1993, he began an alliance and good friendship with actor Jet Li. He directed several of Li's films, beginning with Fong Sai-yuk and Fong Sai-yuk II, and continuing through The Bodyguard from Beijing, The New Legend of Shaolin and My Father Is a Hero, and also he choreographed two Jet Li's films: The New Legend of Shaolin and High Risk.

In the 2000s, Yuen directed the 2006 film DOA: Dead or Alive, based on the Dead or Alive fighting game series.  The film stars Holly Valance, Jaime Pressly, Devon Aoki, Sarah Carter and the former WCW, TNA and WWE wrestler Kevin Nash.

Later and American works
Once Li gained stardom in American cinemas beginning with 1998 film Lethal Weapon 4, Yuen's action direction also received fame in the West. He worked in the 2000 blockbuster X-Men as an action director, and he would also handle the martial arts and action sequences in six of Jet Li's other American works: Romeo Must Die, Kiss of the Dragon, The One, Cradle 2 the Grave, War, and The Expendables.

He also partially directed The Transporter and So Close, released in 2002. He did not return to direct the sequel Transporter 2, released in 2005. However, his team of stuntmen and martial artists are featured in the film, and Yuen was the fight choreographer and second unit director. His style of action is not as distinct as that of other Hong Kong action directors like Yuen Woo-ping and Ching Siu-tung, but is noted for its speed, creativity, and higher emphasis on offence. He is also distinguished in his ability to mix hand-to-hand combat and gun fighting, two styles of fighting that are not often used together successfully in Hong Kong action films.

Filmography

Films 
This is a partial list of films.
 Deaf and Mute Heroine (1971)
 Fist of Fury (1972)
 The Yellow Killer (1972)
 Tough Guy (1972)
 Intimate Confessions of a Chinese Courtesan (1972)
 The Brutal Boxer (1972)
 The 14 Amazons (1972) (cameo)
 The Rats (1973)
 The Money Tree (1973)
 Death Blow (1973)
 Chinese Hercules (1973)
 The Black Belt (1973)
 Wits to Wits (1974)
 The Tournament (1974)
 The Shadow Boxer (1974)
 Naughty! Naughty!  (1974)
 The Evil Snake Girl (1974)
 Valiant Ones (1975)
 The Man from Hong Kong (1975)
 The Himalayan (1976)
 Bruce Lee and I (1976)
 To Kill a Jaguar (1977)
 Snuff Bottle Connection (1977)
 Six Directions of Boxing (1977)
 Secret Rivals 2 (1977)
 Pursuit of Vengeance (1977)
 The Mighty Peking Man (1977)
 Last Strike (1977)
 The Invincible Armour (1977)
 Instant Kung Fu Man (1977)
 Heroes of Shaolin (1977)
 The Fatal Flying Guillotines (1977)
 Death Duel (1977)
 Broken Oath (1977)
 The Vengeful Beauty (1978)
 Flying Guillotine 2 (1978)
 Massacre Survivor (1978)
 Dance of the Drunk Mantis (1979)
 We’re Going to Eat You (1980)
 Ring of Death (1980)
 The Buddha Assassinator (1980)
 Perils of the Sentimental Swordsman (1982)
 Zu Warriors from the Magic Mountain (1983)
 Heart of Dragon (1985)
 Righting Wrongs (a.k.a. Above the Law) (1986)
 Millionaire's Express (1986)
 Eastern Condors (1987)
 Spooky, Spooky (1988)
 In the Blood (1988)
 Couples, Couples, Couples (1988)
 She Shoots Straight (1990)
 The Raid (1990)
 The Nocturnal Demon (1990)
 Mortuary Blues (1990)
 All for the Winner (1990)
 Top Bet (1991)
 Saviour of the Soul (1991)
 Red Shield (1991)
 Fist of Fury 1991 (1991)
 Bury Me High (1991)
 Saviour of the Soul 2 (1992)
 A Kid from Tibet (1992)
 Fist of Fury 1991 II (1992)
 Women on the Run (1993)
 Kick Boxer (1993)
 Fong Sai-yuk II (a.k.a. The Legend of Fong Sai Yuk II and The Legend 2) (1993)
 The New Legend of Shaolin (a.k.a. Legend of the Red Dragon) (1994)
 High Risk (a.k.a. Meltdown) (1995)
 Hero (a.k.a. Ma Wing Jing) (1997)
 Just Another Pandora's Box (2010)
 A Chinese Odyssey Part Three (2016)

Director

References

External links
 
 Chinese Actors
 Kung Fu Cinema: Corey Yuen Filmography (complete)

1951 births
Hong Kong male actors
Hong Kong film directors
Living people
Chinese choreographers
Action choreographers
Chinese film producers
Hong Kong film producers
Chinese film directors